Todd Berry (born November 12, 1960) is an American former college football coach. He served the head football coach at the Illinois State University from 1996 to 1999, the United States Military Academy from 2000 to 2003, and the University of Louisiana at Monroe from 2010 until his firing during the 2015 season, compiling a career head coach record of 57–102. Since 2016, Berry has been the executive director of the American Football Coaches Association (AFCA). He is the son of Reuben Berry, who was head football coach at Sterling College in Sterling, Kansas] and Missouri Southern State University and head coach for the Saskatchewan Roughriders of the Canadian Football League (CFL).

Head coaching career

Illinois State
Berry was the 19th head football coach at Illinois State University in Normal, Illinois, serving for seasons, from 1996 to 1999, and compiling a record of 24–24.

Army
Berry was named the 32nd head football coach at the United States Military Academy in West Point, New York, beginning in the 2000 season. In 2003, he was fired after an 0–6 start, and the team finished the season with an 0–13 record. Berry has the lowest winning percentage of any Army head coach who served as head coach for more than six games.

Louisiana–Monroe
Berry was the offensive coordinator for the University of Louisiana at Monroe from 2004 to 2005 under head coach Charlie Weatherbie. He returned Louisiana–Monroe as head football coach in 2010. Berry was fired by Louisiana–Monroe on November 14, 2015.

Head coaching record

Notes

References

1960 births
Living people
Army Black Knights football coaches
East Carolina Pirates football coaches
Illinois State Redbirds football coaches
Louisiana–Monroe Warhawks football coaches
Place of birth missing (living people)
Miami Hurricanes football coaches
Mississippi State Bulldogs football coaches
Oklahoma State Cowboys football coaches
Southeast Missouri State Redhawks football coaches
Tennessee Volunteers football coaches
UT Martin Skyhawks football coaches
Tulsa Golden Hurricane football coaches
UNLV Rebels football coaches